Aleksander Klemens Gabszewicz (6 December 1911 – 10 October 1983) was a Polish fighter pilot and a World War II fighter ace, with a score of 9½ confirmed and 2 probable kills.

Biography
Born in Szawle, then in Russian Empire, in 1931 he joined the Polish Army. Initially serving as an infantry NCO, in 1938 he graduated from the Dęblin-based Eagles' School and was attached to the air wing of the Border Defence Corps. Just before World War II he was a tactical officer of the IV/1 Fighter Group.

After the outbreak of the Polish September Campaign on 1 September 1939, around 9 AM, he scored his first kill, a Heinkel He 111 of 5.(K)/LG 1 unit over Ciechanów. According to some authors, it was the first kill of a German plane in World War II.

Downed the same day, he made it to France where he became the commanding officer of the 5th key of Groupe de Chasse III/10 covering Besançon. There, while piloting a Bloch 151, he downed a Dornier Do 17.

After the capitulation he made it to the United Kingdom, where he served in the ranks of No. 607 Squadron RAF and No. 303 Polish Fighter Squadron. In December 1940 he was posted as a flight commander in No. 316 Polish Fighter Squadron. He became the commanding officer in November 1941. He was posted to 11 Group HQ in June 1942, and then as an instructor to 58 OTU until June 1943. He was then made wing commander/flying of the 2nd Polish Wing and finally the 1st Polish Wing. He was also attached to the 56th USAAF Fighter Group in December 1943, and then commanded 131 Wing RAF in February 1944, leading the wing during the invasion of Normandy. He became the commanding officer of RAF Coltishall in February 1945.

He ended the war in the Polish rank of generał brygady and remained in exile in the United Kingdom. He died in Malvern in 1983. His ashes were brought to Poland in 1992 and dispersed over Warsaw and Dęblin.

Legacy
The Battle of Britain Memorial Flight's Spitfire TE311 is painted to represent the aircraft flown by Gabszewicz in Germany from April to June 1945.

Decorations
 Distinguished Service Order (with Bar)
 Distinguished Flying Cross
 Croix de Guerre (France)
 Virtuti Militari (Golden Cross)
 Virtuti Militari (Silver Cross)
 Commander's Cross with Star of the Order of Polonia Restituta
 Cross of Valour, four times

References
  Short biography
  extended biographical note at Myśliwcy web page
 Aleksander K. Gabszewicz
Citations

Bibliography
 Tadeusz Jerzy Krzystek, Anna Krzystek: Polskie Siły Powietrzne w Wielkiej Brytanii w latach 1940-1947 łącznie z Pomocniczą Lotniczą Służbą Kobiet (PLSK-WAAF). Sandomierz: Stratus, 2012, p. 185. 
 Piotr Sikora: Asy polskiego lotnictwa. Warszawa: Oficyna Wydawnicza Alma-Press. 2014, pp. 199–208. 
 Józef Zieliński: Asy polskiego lotnictwa. Warszawa: Agencja lotnicza ALTAIR, 1994, p. 20. ISBN 83862172. 
 Józef Zieliński: Lotnicy polscy w Bitwie o Wielką Brytanię. Warszawa: Oficyna Wydawnicza MH, 2005, pp. 50–51. 

1911 births
1983 deaths
People from Šiauliai
People from Shavelsky Uyezd
Polish World War II flying aces
Polish generals
Companions of the Distinguished Service Order
Recipients of the Croix de Guerre 1939–1945 (France)
Recipients of the Distinguished Flying Cross (United Kingdom)
Recipients of the Gold Cross of the Virtuti Militari
Commanders with Star of the Order of Polonia Restituta
Recipients of the Cross of Valour (Poland)
Royal Air Force officers
The Few
Royal Air Force pilots of World War II
Polish emigrants to the United Kingdom